Instituto San Fernando is a Chilean high school located in San Fernando, Colchagua Province, Chile.

Notable alumni

 Patricio Rey Sommer, politician, Intendant of O'Higgins Region (2010-2013);
 Jordi Castell, television presenter;
 José Arraño Acevedo, journalist and historian of Pichilemu;

References

Educational institutions with year of establishment missing
Secondary schools in Chile
Schools in Colchagua Province